William Richard Dreesen (July 26, 1904 – November 9, 1971) was a third baseman in Major League Baseball. He played for the Boston Braves in 1931.

References

External links

1904 births
1971 deaths
Major League Baseball third basemen
Boston Braves players
Baseball players from New York City